Sentinel Capital Partners, L.L.C. is an American private-equity firm focusing on mid-market companies. The company is headquartered in New York City and was founded in 1994 by David Lobel and John McCormack after working together at Salomon Smith Barney.

Operations 
Sentinel invests in companies through various private equity strategies including Leveraged Buyouts, Mezzanine capital, Management Buyouts, Corporate Divestitures, Industry Consolidations, Going-Private Transactions, and Growth Capital transactions in the United States and Canada. The firm has focused its investments in companies operating in the aerospace, defense, business service, consumer, distribution, food, restaurant, franchising, industrial and healthcare sectors.

Sentinel says it prefers to invest between $10 million and $75 million in businesses having enterprise values between $25 million and $250 million, and EBITDA between $7 million and $65 million. While most of its deal involve Sentinel being the majority-investor, it co-invests selectively. The firm seeks to exit its investments between five and seven years through alternative exit strategies, such as sales, mergers or recapitalizations, or an initial public offering.

Investment funds
Sentinel invests through a series of private limited partnerships and its investors include a variety of pension funds, endowments, and other institutional investors. Since Sentinel's establishment in 1995, it has raised six private equity funds and one mezzanine capital fund.

Investors in Sentinel Funds include college and university endowments, foundations, state and government retirement systems, corporate pension plans, insurance companies, sovereign wealth funds, investment advisors, family offices, and Taft-Hartley plans located in the United States, Europe, China, Japan, Australia, and the Middle East.

Controversy

Buffet Holdings Settlement 
In 2010, the creditors of Buffets Holding sued Sentinel and its investment partner Caxton-Iseman Capital for “bilk[ing] Buffets of hundreds of millions of dollars" that lead to its insolvency. Sentinel and CI Capital settled the lawsuit for more than $23 million.

TGI Fridays 
Sentinel and Triartisan Capital Partners acquired TGI Fridays in 2014 from Carlson a month after the company facing a nationwide collective action wage theft lawsuit. The company tried to prevent certification of an FLSA collective by settling with individual workers that alleged unpaid wages up to $91 million. Eventually TGI Fridays settled in 2017 for over $19 million to over 28,000 workers, the largest wage and hour payout at the time. In 2018, TGI Fridays was also found to have failed to pay £59,348 to its U.K. staff.

In 2019, TGI Friday was sued in a proposed class-action lawsuit for selling potato skin chips that don't contain potato skins.

In April 2020, Sentinel's deal to take TGI Friday's public was called off due to "extraordinary market conditions" due to the coronavirus outbreak.

Past Investments
The firm has previously invested in franchise holders of some of the world's largest fast food chains such as Checkers and Rally's, Church's Chicken, Pizza Hut and Taco Bell.

Other past holdings include Colson Group, The Cin Group, Critical Solutions International, Driven Performance Brands, Hollander Sleep Products, Luminaires, Marketplace Events, National Spine and Pain Centers, Playcore, Power Products, Quick Weight Loss Centers, Revenew, RotoMetrics, and WellSpring Pharmaceutical.

Current Investments

Aerospace 

 Airboss Defense Group
 Total Military Management

Business Services 

 Apex Companies
 Corporate Visions
 Mobile Communications
 New Era Technology
 Revenew
 Ubeo Business Services

Consumer 

 Cabi
 GSM Outdoors
 Holley Performance Products, Inc.
 Pet Supplies Plus

Food / Restaurants 

 Captain D's
 Fazoli Group
 Newk's Eatery

Healthcare 

 Altima Dental
 MB2 Dental
 NY Bariatric Group

Industrials 

 Colson Group
 ECM Industries
 Nekoosa
 SONNY's: The Carwash Factory

References

External links 

 
 Sentinel Capital Partners at Google Finance
 Sentinel Capital Partners at Hoovers

Private equity firms of the United States
Companies based in New York City
Financial services companies established in 1995